Rebecca Smith may refer to:

Arts and entertainment
Kate Harrington (poet) (Rebecca Harrington Smith, 1831–1917), American teacher and poet
Carlene Carter (Rebecca Carlene Smith, born 1955), American country singer and songwriter

Sports
Rebecca Smith (footballer) (born 1981), New Zealand soccer player
Rebecca Smith (swimmer), Canadian swimmer
Becky Wiber (born 1959), Canadian swimmer born Rebecca Smith

Other
Rebecca Smith (infanticide) (1807–1849), last British woman executed for infanticide
Rebecca Smith (journalist) (fl. 1970s–2020s), American reporter
Rebecca Beach Smith (born 1949), U.S. federal judge
Rebecca Smith (c. 1848–?), one of the Ascott Martyrs, English women imprisoned for 7-10 days in 1873 for their role in founding a branch of the National Union of Agricultural Workers